The 2018–19 La Liga season, also known as LaLiga Santander for sponsorship reasons, was the 88th since its establishment. The season began on 17 August 2018 and finished on 19 May 2019. Fixtures for the 2018–19 season were announced on 24 July 2018. This was the first La Liga season to use the VAR.

Barcelona were the defending champions, and they secured a second consecutive title with three games to spare following victory over Levante on 27 April. Huesca, Rayo Vallecano and Valladolid joined as the promoted clubs from the 2017–18 Segunda División. They replaced Málaga, Las Palmas and Deportivo La Coruña, who were relegated to the 2018–19 Segunda División.

This is the first season since 2008–09 that did not feature the league's all time second-highest scorer Cristiano Ronaldo, who scored 311 goals in 292 La Liga matches.

Summary
Several clubs made managerial changes before the start of the season. Among them were Real Madrid, when Zinedine Zidane resigned following the club's third consecutive UEFA Champions League victory. He was replaced by Julen Lopetegui, who was managing the Spain national team at the 2018 FIFA World Cup in Russia at the time of announcement and was dismissed from that job as a result. Other incomers included Pablo Machín at Sevilla, who was hired after his success with newly promoted Girona the previous season.

In the transfer window, the biggest deal saw Real Madrid lose Cristiano Ronaldo to Juventus for a fee of €112 million; the Portuguese forward had scored 450 goals in 438 games during his nine years in the Spanish capital. Real Madrid's additions included Belgium international goalkeeper Thibaut Courtois for €35 million from Chelsea, and striker Mariano returned to the club from Lyon for €22 million. Defending champions Barcelona added Clément Lenglet to their defence, Arturo Vidal to midfield, and spent over €40 million on Brazilian forward Malcom. Players exiting Barcelona included Andrés Iniesta at the end of a successful 16-year-spell, as he signed for Vissel Kobe in Japan.

Veterans Gabi and Fernando Torres also left Atlético Madrid for new teams in Asia, while the same club welcomed in the likes of World Cup-winning French midfielder Thomas Lemar and Portugal's Gelson Martins. After a successful previous season, in which the team finished fourth and returned to the Champions League, Valencia made permanent the loan signing of Portuguese winger Gonçalo Guedes from Paris Saint-Germain and Geoffrey Kondogbia from Inter Milan. Forward Simone Zaza and midfielder João Cancelo both left to Italy, while Kevin Gameiro arrived as replacement. Athletic Bilbao sold Kepa Arrizabalaga to Chelsea for €80 million, a world record fee for a goalkeeper.

The tenth round of matches featured the first El Clásico of the season, which Barcelona won 5–1 at home against Real Madrid with a hat-trick by Luis Suárez. The result put Madrid into 9th place, and led to the dismissal of Lopetegui after only five months. Other early pace-setters included Sevilla with their prolific strike partnership of André Silva and Wissam Ben Yedder, Alavés who were briefly league leaders in mid-October, Espanyol, and Valladolid who had been taken over by former Brazil international Ronaldo.

Teams

Promotion and relegation (pre-season)
A total of 20 teams will contest the league, including 17 sides from the 2017–18 season and three promoted from the 2017–18 Segunda División. This will include the two top teams from the Segunda División, and the winners of the play-offs.
 
Teams relegated to Segunda División
 
The first team to be relegated from La Liga were Málaga. Their relegation was ensured on 19 April 2018, following a late 0−1 defeat to Levante, ending their 10-year spell in the top division.
 
The second team to be relegated were Las Palmas, after a 0−4 home defeat to Deportivo Alavés on 22 April 2018, ending their three-year spell in the league.
 
The last team to be relegated were Deportivo La Coruña, following a 2−4 home loss to Barcelona on 29 April 2018. This result ensured Deportivo's third relegation in seven years, and also handed Barcelona their 25th La Liga title.
 
Teams promoted from Segunda División
 
On 21 May 2018, Huesca were promoted to La Liga for the first time ever by winning 2–0 at Lugo.
 
Rayo Vallecano was the second team to earn promotion to La Liga on 27 May 2018 by winning against Lugo as well, this time 1–0. Rayo returned after a two-year absence.
 
Valladolid was the last team to be promoted after beating Sporting Gijón and Numancia in the play-offs. Valladolid returned to top division after 4 years.
 
This was the first season since the 2014–15 season without any teams from the archipelagos of Spain (teams located on the Balearic Islands and Canary Islands) since Las Palmas was relegated and Tenerife failed to qualify for the promotion play-offs.

Stadia and locations

 
Celta signed a sponsorship contract with Abanca to rename their stadium as Abanca-Balaídos.

Matches outside Spain
On 16 August 2018, La Liga signed a 15-year agreement with Relevant Sports (owners of the International Champions Cup) to schedule one match per season within the United States. This would mark the first time ever that an official La Liga league match would be held there. The match between Girona and Barcelona, to be played on 27 January 2019, was selected to be played in Miami, but it required the approval of the Royal Spanish Football Federation. On 21 September 2018, the Spanish Football Federation denied approval of the match being held in Miami. On 26 October 2018, following a request for guidance from the Spanish Football Federation, US Soccer and CONCACAF, the FIFA Council discussed La Liga's proposal. At the end of the meeting, the FIFA Council stated that "Consistent with the opinion expressed by the Football Stakeholders Committee, the Council emphasised the sporting principle that official league matches must be played within the territory of the respective member association". On 13 December 2018, Barcelona left their disposition to play the match in Miami without effect.

Personnel and sponsorship

1. On the back of shirt.
2. On the sleeves.
3. On the shorts.
4. On the away jersey.

Managerial changes

League table

Standings

Results

Season statistics

Scoring
First goal of the season:   Roger Martí for Levante against Real Betis (17 August 2018)
Last goal of the season:   Pablo de Blasis for Eibar against Barcelona (19 May 2019)

Top goalscorers

Zamora Trophy

The Zamora Trophy is awarded by newspaper Marca to the goalkeeper with the lowest goals-to-games ratio. A goalkeeper has to have played at least 28 games of 60 or more minutes to be eligible for the trophy.

Hat-tricks

Note
(H) – Home ; (A) – Away

Discipline

Player
 Most yellow cards: 17
  Álvaro (Villarreal)
  Éver Banega (Sevilla)
  Mario Gaspar (Villarreal)
 Most red cards: 2
  Luis Advíncula (Rayo Vallecano)
  Álvaro (Villarreal)
  Abdoulaye Ba (Rayo Vallecano)
  Éver Banega (Sevilla)
  Erick Cabaco (Levante)
  Gustavo Cabral (Celta Vigo)
  Djené Dakonam (Getafe)
  Óscar de Marcos (Athletic Bilbao)
  Bernardo Espinosa (Girona)
  Jorge Pulido (Huesca)
  Rubén Rochina (Levante)

Team
 Most yellow cards: 121
 Athletic Bilbao
 Most red cards: 8
 Rayo Vallecano
 Fewest yellow cards: 77
 Barcelona
 Fewest red cards: 0
 Valladolid

Average attendances

LaLiga Awards

Monthly

Number of teams by autonomous community 
Source:

References

 

 
2018-19
Spain
1